Casiano Céspedes (born 1924, date of death unknown) was a Paraguayan football defender who played for Paraguay in the 1950 FIFA World Cup. He also played for Club Olimpia. Céspedes is deceased.

References

External links
FIFA profile

1924 births
Year of death missing
Paraguayan footballers
Paraguay international footballers
Association football defenders
Club Olimpia footballers
1950 FIFA World Cup players